Epitoxis ansorgei is a moth of the  subfamily Arctiinae. It was described by Rothschild in 1910. It is found in Kenya and Uganda.

References

 Natural History Museum Lepidoptera generic names catalog

Arctiinae
Moths described in 1910